The accession of North Macedonia to the European Union has been on the current agenda for future enlargement of the EU since 2005, when it became a candidate for accession. The Republic of Macedonia submitted its membership application in 2004, thirteen years after its independence from Yugoslavia. It is one of eight current EU candidate countries, together with Albania, Bosnia and Herzegovina, Moldova, Montenegro, Serbia, Turkey and Ukraine.

The use of the country name "Macedonia" was the object of a dispute with neighboring Greece between 1991 and 2019, resulting in a Greek veto against EU and NATO accession talks, which lasted from 2008 to 2019. After the issue was resolved, the EU gave its formal approval to begin accession talks with North Macedonia and Albania in March 2020. 

However, in November 2020, Bulgaria effectively blocked the official start of North Macedonia's EU Accession Negotiations over what it perceives as slow progress on the implementation of the 2017 Friendship Treaty between the two countries, state-supported or tolerated hate speech, and minority claims towards Bulgaria.

On 24 June 2022, Bulgaria's parliament approved lifting the country's veto on opening EU accession talks with North Macedonia. On 16 July 2022, the Assembly of North Macedonia also approved the revised French proposal, allowing accession negotiations to begin. The start of negotiations was officially launched on 19 July 2022. To make progress, however, the country must change its constitution, including the local Bulgarians in it, and overcome the latent opposition of neighbouring Bulgaria.

History 

North Macedonia began its formal process of rapprochement with the European Union in 2000, by initiating negotiations about the EU's Stabilisation and Association Process, and it became the first non-EU country in the Balkans to sign the Stabilisation and Association Agreement (SAA), on 9 April 2001 in Luxembourg. The agreement was ratified by the Macedonian parliament on 12 April 2001 and came into force on 1 April 2004.

On 22 March 2004, the Republic of Macedonia submitted its application for EU membership. On 6 September 2004, the Macedonian government adopted a National Strategy for European integration, supported by the country's parliament through its Commission for European Issues. The government subsequently began the procedure of answering the questionnaire of the European Commission regarding its performance in preparation for membership in accordance with the Copenhagen criteria, a process that was finished by 31 January 2005. The European Council officially granted the country candidate status on 17 December 2005, after a review and a positive recommendation of the candidacy by the European Commission.

After the naming dispute with Greece was solved in 2019, accession negotiations were expected to start within the same year, but in June 2019 the EU General Affairs Council decided to postpone the decision to October, due to objections from a number of countries including the Netherlands and France.  France vetoed the decision again in October. On 25 March 2020 the Council of the European Union decided to open accession negotiations, which was endorsed by the European Council the following day.

On 17 November 2020 Bulgaria blocked the official start of accession talks with the country. North Macedonia was told to offer further guarantees to Bulgaria that it would honour the 2017 friendship treaty, which deals with historical issues.

Name dispute with Greece 

A major obstacle for the accession process was the Republic's unresolved objection by Greece over its name, as Greece argued that it implied territorial ambitions towards Greece's own northern province of Macedonia. While the country preferred to be called by its constitutional name, Republic of Macedonia, the European Union, in acknowledgment of concerns raised by Greece, maintained a practice of recognising it only as the "former Yugoslav Republic of Macedonia", a compromise of "provisional reference" introduced by the United Nations in 1993. Greece, as any other EU country, has veto power against new accessions, and blocked Macedonian accession due to the naming dispute.

On 12 June 2018, an agreement was reached between Greek prime minister Alexis Tsipras and his Macedonian counterpart Zoran Zaev, known as the Prespa agreement, under which the country would be renamed the "Republic of North Macedonia". As part of this deal, Greece explicitly withdrew its previous opposition, allowing the EU to approve on 26 June 2018 a pathway to starting accession talks.

Historical and linguistic dispute with Bulgaria 

Although Bulgaria was the first country to recognize the independence of the then Republic of Macedonia, most of its academics, as well as the general public, do not recognize the Macedonian language and nation formed after the Second World War as being separate from Bulgarian proper. As part of the efforts to find a solution to the Macedonia name dispute with Greece, the Macedonian constitution was changed twice (in 1995, and then again in 2018) to formally exclude any possible territorial aspirations towards neighboring countries.

Some Macedonian politicians consider Bulgarian territory to be part of a greater Macedonia, claiming the majority of the population there are oppressed ethnic Macedonians. Macedonia and Bulgaria signed a friendship treaty to improve their complicated relations in August 2017. A joint commission on historical and educational issues was formed in 2018 to serve as a forum where controversial historical and educational issues could be raised and discussed. This commission has made little progress in its work for a period of one year.

In October 2019, Bulgaria set out a “Framework position” warning that it would block the accession process unless North Macedonia fulfilled demands regarding anti-Bulgarian ideology in the country, and ultimately over an 'ongoing nation-building process' based on historical negationism of the Bulgarian identity, culture and legacy in the broader region of Macedonia.

Bulgarian politicians claim North Macedonia remains the only country in NATO, that is an EU-candidate, whose politics is based on communist historical and linguistic dogmas accepted by ASNOM. Concerning the Macedonian language, Bulgaria advises the EU to avoid using the term “Macedonian language” during the accession talks, and instead use the term “Official language of Republic of North Macedonia”, reaffirming that it does not recognize the language as separate from Bulgarian. In North Macedonia this is widely perceived as a direct attack on its national identity and language.

In September 2020 Bulgaria has sent an explanatory memorandum to the Council of the European Union containing its framework position on the accession of North Macedonia. On 17 November 2020, Bulgaria refused to approve the European Union's negotiation framework for North Macedonia, effectively blocking the official start of accession talks with this country over slow progress on the implementation of the 2017 Friendship Treaty between the two countries, state-supported or tolerated hate speech and minority claims towards Bulgaria.  

The veto received condemnation by some intellectuals, and criticism from international observers. A survey conducted in November 2020, by Alpha Research of 803 people from all over Bulgaria, found that 83.8% of Bulgarians were against the accession of North Macedonia in the EU until the historical dispute is solved, only 10.2% of Bulgarians supported the accession with the rest not having an opinion.

In June 2022 at the very end of the French Presidency of the Council of the European Union (January–June), an urgent proposal has been put by the president Emmanuel Macron to resolve the dispute between the two countries. The proposal provoked a political crisis in Bulgaria. On June 8, Slavi Trifonov withdrew his party from Bulgaria’s governing coalition, citing the issue of North Macedonia. This faced criticism from President Rumen Radev, who said the proposal was relatively good. However, the government abdicated its responsibility and delegated it entirely to the parliament. As result on 22 June the Bulgarian government faced a motion of no confidence, which it lost. Nevertheless, on 24 June, after heated discussions, the parliament approved lifting the veto. President Macron claimed that the European leaders have put a lot of pressure on Bulgaria to accept this deal, confirming its approval was a “very good signal”. On June 25th, the Ministry of Foreign Affairs in Sofia stated in a standpoint that the speed with which North Macedonia would approach the EU membership, already depended on itself. Two days before the end of the French presidency of the EU, the Prime Minister of North Macedonia Kovačevski stated that the government remains of the opinion that the agreement proposed from Paris and approved by Bulgaria is unacceptable for the country. However since then, the proposal has been backed by the government of North Macedonia. In early July 2022, protests began in North Macedonia against the French proposal. However, the proposal was accepted by the Assembly of North Macedonia on 16 July 2022. 

On July 17 in Sofia, the foreign ministers of Bulgaria and North Macedonia signed a second bilateral protocol to the Treaty of Good Neighborhood and Friendship between the two countries. Such protocols were supposed to be signed every year, but in practice they have not been signed since 2019. According to the decision of the Bulgarian National Assembly of June 24, the signing of this protocol is a condition for Bulgaria to approve the Negotiating Framework for the Republic of North Macedonia. The protocol contains specific measures and deadlines for the implementation of agreements on historical issues between the two countries, measures against hate speech, etc.

On 24 June 2022, Bulgaria's parliament approved lifting the country's veto on opening EU accession talks with North Macedonia. On 16 July 2022, the Assembly of North Macedonia also approved the revised French proposal, allowing accession negotiations to begin. The start of negotiations was officially launched on 19 July 2022. The approved document includes the condition to stop "hate speech" against all "minorities and communities", that North Macedonia recognize a shared history with Bulgaria, and the inclusion of Bulgarian people as a recognized minority in the Constitution. On July 17, North Macedonia signed a special protocol with Bulgaria to cooperate on these subjects. However there was no progress in the inclusion of the Bulgarians in the Macedonian Constitution, though in February 2023, the Bulgarian parliament adopted a declaration condemning, an alleged anti-Bulgarian campaign there and warned it could stop Skopje’s EU integration again.

Domestic politics

EU funding 
North Macedonia has so far received €1.3 billion of development aid until 2020 from the Instrument for Pre-Accession Assistance, a funding mechanism for EU candidate countries.

Campaign 
The government's motto for the candidacy is "The Sun, too, is a star.", referring to the sun from the flag of North Macedonia being displayed among the other stars in the flag of Europe.

Government structuring 
North Macedonia's government has established a management infrastructure for the European integration process on the basis of a paper adopted in 1997 under the title "The strategic bases of the Republic of [North] Macedonia on achieving the membership of the European Union". It consists of the following institutions:

 The Committee for Euro-Atlantic Integration plays the central role in the decision-making of the country's policies in the European integration process. It is chaired by the Prime Minister with members including Deputy Prime Ministers, all ministers in the Government, the Governor of the National Bank of North Macedonia, and the President of the Macedonian Academy of Sciences and Arts.
 The Working Committee for European Integration of the Government of the Republic of [North] Macedonia (WCEI) – It is chaired by the Deputy Prime Ministers in charge of EU Integration, whose deputy is the Minister of Economy. The members are the secretaries from all Ministries. It is an operational, inter-ministerial body establishing the methods and dynamics for implementation of strategic decisions, political guidelines and priorities of the Government, as well as monitoring the realisation of the concrete tasks.
 The Deputy to the President of the Government is responsible for the European integration as centre in the management and co-ordination of the operational part of the integration process. Its support and service is the Sector for European Integration within the General Secretariat of the Government of the former Yugoslav Republic of Macedonia.
 The Sector for European Integration within the Republic's government is given the task to organise, co-ordinate and synchronise the EU integration process. It is organised in seven units in charge of the approximation of the national legislation with that of the EU, translation of the EU legal acts, institution building, support to the WCEI, co-ordination of foreign assistance, and information to the broader public on EU and the European integration process.
 Departments/Sectors/Units for European Integration within the Ministries have similar structure and competencies as the central Sector for European Integration within the Government, being a key link in the institutional infrastructure.
 The Ministry of Foreign Affairs – EU domain – is responsible for communications with the EU structures through the Mission of former Yugoslav Republic of Macedonia in Brussels, gathering valid and timely information that have impact on the integration process and presenting the uniform perspectives and positions in the European structures.

The other institutions supporting the EU integration process are the following:

 The Republic's Assembly and its Commission for European Issues
 The Secretariat for Legislation
 The General Secretariat of the Government
 The Subcommittee of the WCEI for approximation of the legislation with its working groups

Public opinion 
79% of the population of North Macedonia is in favor of EU accession. However, those who think North Macedonia is closer to EU entry today than it was in 2005, when it first received candidate member status, dropped from 57% to 32% between 2018 and 2021.

Sentiments among ethnic Albanians of North Macedonia are traditionally strongly pro-EU.

Chronology of relations with the EU

Visa liberalisation process 
On 1 January 2008 the visa facilitation and readmission agreements between Macedonia and the EU entered into force.
Macedonia began a visa liberalisation dialogue with the EU in February 2008 and was added to the list of visa exempt nationals on 19 December 2009, allowing their citizens to enter the Schengen Area, Bulgaria, Cyprus and Romania without a visa when travelling with biometric passports.

Negotiation progress 
The screening process is underway and no chapters have been opened thus far.

Impact of joining

See also  
 Foreign relations of North Macedonia 
 Foreign relations of the European Union
 Accession of Albania to the European Union
 North Macedonia–NATO relations
 Yugoslavia and the European Economic Community
 Bulgaria–North Macedonia relations 
 Greece–North Macedonia relations

References

External links 
 Relations of the European Union with North Macedonia
 Secretariat of European Affairs of North Macedonia

North Macedonia
 
Politics of North Macedonia